The Tail mansion (尾宿, pinyin: Wěi Xiù) is one of the Twenty-eight mansions of the Chinese constellations. It is one of the eastern mansions of the Azure Dragon.

Asterisms

References 

Chinese constellations